The Dutchmans Stern Conservation Park is a protected area located in South Australia about  north-west of the town of Quorn in the Flinders Ranges. It includes a mountain known as The Dutchmans Stern from which its name is derived.

Description

The name of the conservation park is derived from a mountain named "The Dutchmans Stern" which is located within the boundaries of the conservation park. The conservation park is classified as an IUCN Category VI protected area.

History and purpose
The conservation park was proclaimed under the National Parks and Wildlife Act 1972 in 1987 for:the protection of its geological features, scenic values and native fauna and flora. The diversity of landforms and habitats in the reserve are significant factors contributing to its conservation value, particularly as much of the surrounding land has been used for grazing for over 100 years.

Prior use of the land
As of 1999, it was considered that the Nukunu Aboriginal people are the traditional owners with the possibility of an overlap of jurisdiction with "the Adnyamathanha to the north and with the Parnkalla to the west." The land was the subject of a pastoral lease from the 1880s until acquisition for conservation purposes in 1985. Land within the conservation park has been used as a water catchment with Stoney Creek on the eastern side being "diverted to an engineered channel" that goes to the "Mount Arden dam to supplement the Quorn water supply" while on the western side, run-off "drains into South Creek from where it is piped to serve properties" located to the west. During the 1960s, exploration was carried out in search of mineral deposits which included works such as the construction of the Dutchman Valley track on the western side of the conservation park.

Visitor services
As of 2010, services for visitors include accommodation, camping and a network of walking trails.

Accommodation consisting of the former "Dutchman Homestead and shearers’ quarters" is available for hire from the conservation park's managing authority. Camping using "low impact camping techniques" is permitted on the west side of the conservation park outside of the "Fire Danger Season" from April to November.

The walking track network which start in the carpark at the entrance of the conservation park to the north east of the Dutchman Stern ridge consists of three trails -"The Dutchmans Valley Hike," "The Dutchmans Stern Hike" and a pair of trails known as the "Upper & Lower Eastern Tracks.". The Upper and Lower Eastern Tracks pass along the eastern boundary of the conservation park. The Heysen Trail, a long distance trail, passes through the conservation park on its east and north sides using parts of the alignment of both the Dutchmans Valley Hike and The Dutchmans Stern Hike.

See also
 Protected areas of South Australia

Citations and references

Citations

References

External links
The Dutchmans Stern Conservation Park official webpage
Entry for The Dutchmans Stern Conservation Park on Protected Planet 

Conservation parks of South Australia
Protected areas established in 1987
1987 establishments in Australia
Flinders Ranges
Far North (South Australia)